Thanapol Intharit (or spelt Thanapon Intharit; ; nickname: Suea–เสือ) is a Thai singer, musician, producer and songwriter.

Life and career

He was born in Kalasin province and graduated from  Rajamangala Institute of Technology Isan Campus (Rajamangala University of Technology Isan)  and Ramkhamhaeng University. He started as a musician by forming a band with friends and relatives in the name Chiang Nuea (เฉียงเหนือ) who played as a backup band across the Isan region (northeast region).

Later, he joined the RS Promotion as an art director and costume designer including songwriting, especially Keb Tawan (เก็บตะวัน) in 1988, that is the song that made famous for Itti Palangkul.

In 1994, he had the opportunity to release his first studio album entitled T Kong Suea (ทีของเสือ), which was immediately successful. There are many popular songs such as Rak Kong Yang Mai Por (รักคงยังไม่พอ), Chiwit Nee (ชีวิตหนี้) and 18 Fhon (18 ฝน) and he participated in  Short Charge Shock Rock Concert: Suea Ampan at the Thai Army Sports Stadium with Surat "Pe" Tabwang (Pe Hi-Rock) and Phisut "Jeab" Sabvijit, and joined again in Shot Charge Shock Rock Concert: Lek Kumram with SMF in 1995 at the same place.

In 1998, Intharit moved to Grammy Entertainment and released his second studio album Jai Dee...Su Suea (ใจดี...สู้เสือ) until 2012, he became a free  label musician.

Discography

Studio albums
T Kong Suea (ทีของเสือ) 1994
Jai Dee...Su Suea (ใจดี...สู้เสือ) 1998
Khon Chai Chiwit (คนใช้ชีวิต) 2000
Chong Wang Nai Hua Jai (ช่องว่างในหัวใจ) 2003
Rak Khon Thai (รักคนไทย) 2005
Tawee Khun (ทวีคูณ) 2008

Singles
 Kaewta Duangjai (แก้วตาดวงใจ) (ost. of Kaewta Duangjai; 1991)
Kadee Daeng (คดีแดง) (ost. of Kadee Daeng; 1991)
Sia Khon (เสียคน) (ost. of Nam Pu; 2002)
Ton Thun (ต้นทุน) (ost. of Sam Hua Jai Soem Yai Lek; 2014)

References

1964 births
Living people
Thanapol Intharit
Thanapol Intharit
Thanapol Intharit
Thanapol Intharit